Oebele Schokker (born 11 November 1984) is a Dutch former professional footballer. He formerly played for SC Cambuur, FC Emmen and Harkemase Boys.

From the beginning of the 2017–18 season, Schokker began playing in the first team of VV Jubbega of the lower tier Tweede Klasse, also serving as an assistant coach. In April 2019, he returned to his youth club, UDIROS, where he heads the youth department.

References

External links
 Voetbal International profile 

1984 births
Living people
Dutch footballers
SC Cambuur players
FC Emmen players
Eredivisie players
Eerste Divisie players
Derde Divisie players
Sportspeople from Heerenveen
Association football forwards
Harkemase Boys players
Footballers from Friesland